Samuel Christopher Lancaster (1864 – March 4, 1941) was an American engineer and landscape architect, known for his work on the Columbia River Highway.

Biography

Samuel Lancaster was born in Magnolia, Mississippi in 1864, and grew up in Jackson, Tennessee.

He came to Oregon in 1908 and was hired by Sam Hill to design his experimental roads at Maryhill in 1909. He did a plan for the campus of Linfield College before beginning supervision of the Columbia River Highway in 1913. He also promoted Crown Point as the site of an observatory.

Lancaster was instrumental in the building of the 7-mile Larch Mountain Trail, which begins at the Multnomah Falls Lodge and climbs to the summit of Larch Mountain.  The trail was completed in September 1915.  In October 1915, he founded the Trails Club of Oregon and became its first president.

He died from leukemia at his home in Portland on March 4, 1941.

References

External links
 

American landscape architects
American engineers
Historic Columbia River Highway
1864 births
1941 deaths
Artists from Oregon
People from Magnolia, Mississippi